Gerhard Scharf is an Austrian Paralympic athlete and para table tennis player. At the 1984 Summer Paralympics he competed in athletics and at the Summer Paralympics of 1988, 1992, 1996 and 2000 he competed in individual and team para table tennis events. In total he won one gold medal, one silver medal and one bronze medal at the Summer Paralympics, all in table tennis.

In the Men's Teams 2 event at the 1992 Summer Paralympics he won the gold medal together with Rudolf Hajek. At the 1996 Summer Paralympics he won two medals in table tennis events: the silver medal in the Men's Teams 1–2, once again together with Rudolf Hajek, and one of the bronze medals in the Men's Singles 2 event.

References

External links 
 

Living people
Year of birth missing (living people)
Place of birth missing (living people)
Athletes (track and field) at the 1984 Summer Paralympics
Table tennis players at the 1988 Summer Paralympics
Table tennis players at the 1992 Summer Paralympics
Table tennis players at the 1996 Summer Paralympics
Table tennis players at the 2000 Summer Paralympics
Medalists at the 1992 Summer Paralympics
Medalists at the 1996 Summer Paralympics
Paralympic gold medalists for Austria
Paralympic silver medalists for Austria
Paralympic bronze medalists for Austria
Paralympic athletes of Austria
Paralympic table tennis players of Austria
Paralympic medalists in table tennis
Austrian male table tennis players
20th-century Austrian people